Dmitry Olegovich Larionov (born 22 December 1985) is a Russian slalom canoeist who has competed since the early 2000s in the C-2 class together with his partner Mikhail Kuznetsov.

He won a bronze medal in the C2 event at the 2008 Summer Olympics in Beijing. He also finished 14th in 2012 and 6th in 2016 in the same event.

He won a bronze medal in the C2 team event at the 2015 European Championships.

References

External links
Overview of athlete's results at canoeslalom.net

1985 births
Canoeists at the 2008 Summer Olympics
Canoeists at the 2012 Summer Olympics
Canoeists at the 2016 Summer Olympics
Living people
Olympic canoeists of Russia
Olympic bronze medalists for Russia
Russian male canoeists
Olympic medalists in canoeing
Medalists at the 2008 Summer Olympics
People from Nizhny Tagil
Sportspeople from Sverdlovsk Oblast